New York State Route 105 (NY 105) is a  state highway located within Nassau County, New York, in the United States. It begins in the town of Hempstead at an intersection with NY 106 in North Bellmore that also serves as that route's southern terminus. From here, it runs east through North Wantagh to an interchange with NY 135 before crossing into the town of Oyster Bay and ending at a junction with NY 107 in Massapequa. Jerusalem Avenue continues west past the route's western terminus as a county-maintained road to Hempstead and east as a town road to Massapequa Preserve. NY 105 was assigned in the early 1930s.

Route description 

NY 105 begins at an intersection with NY 106 (Newbridge Road) and Jerusalem Avenue in the North Bellmore section of the town of Hempstead. West of this point, Jerusalem Avenue is county-maintained as County Route 105 (CR 105), an unsigned route. NY 105 proceeds east along the two-lane Jerusalem Avenue, paralleling the Southern State Parkway as it travels through a commercial section of North Bellmore. After , the road widens slightly to include a center turn lane. Not far to the east, NY 105 crosses over the Wantagh State Parkway without connecting to the highway.

On the opposite side of the parkway overpass, NY 105 crosses into North Wantagh and an area known as Downtown Wantagh, where the route intersects with Wantagh Avenue (unsigned CR 189), formerly designated as NY 115. After Wantagh Avenue, NY 105 crosses through a residential section of North Wantagh named Wantagh Woods, where it bends southeast and briefly gains a frontage road on the eastbound side. After a half-mile (0.8 km), NY 105 curves back to the east at an interchange with the Seaford–Oyster Bay Expressway (NY 135).

Past NY 135, NY 105 leaves North Wantagh and heads past Washington Avenue County Park before crossing into the adjacent town of Oyster Bay. Within Oyster Bay, the road runs across the northern edge of Massapequa before meeting NY 107 in a commercial district located a short distance from the town line. The NY 105 ends here; however, Jerusalem Avenue continues east past NY 107 toward Massapequa Preserve as a town-maintained highway.

History
The highway now designated NY 105 was improved to state highway standards as part of a project contracted out by the state of New York on September 20, 1907. The reconstructed roads were added to the state highway system on November 2, 1908, as unsigned State Highway 437 (SH 437). Both parts of SH 437 received posted route numbers in the early 1930s, with the Jerusalem Avenue segment becoming part of NY 105 . NY 105's alignment has not been altered since.

Major intersections

See also

References

External links

105
Transportation in Nassau County, New York
Roads on Long Island